ISoFT is the abbreviation for the International Symposium on Fluorous Technologies. This symposium series was founded to discuss recent advances, including commercial applications, of technologies related to fluorous chemistry.

History 
 The first meeting of ISoFT was held July 3–6, 2005 in Bordeaux, France.  Jean-Marc Vincent and Richard H. Fish organized the first symposium, selected the International Advisory Board, and instituted the Fluorous Technology Award.
 The second meeting of ISoFT was held July 29-August 1, 2007 in Yokohama, Japan. The meeting was chaired by Drs. Junzo Otera and Kenichi Hatanaka.
 The third ISoFT meeting was held in conjunction with the 19th International Symposium on Fluorine Chemistry from August 23–28, 2009 in Jackson Hole, Wyoming.
 The fourth meeting of ISoFT was at the City University of Hong Kong from November 30-December 3, 2011 and was chaired by Dr. István T. Horváth.
 The fifth ISoFT meeting was held from June 2–5, 2013 at Eötvös Loránd University in Budapest, Hungary, and was chaired by József Rábai.
 The sixth ISoFT meeting was held from August 23–28, 2015 at Politecnico di Milano in Como, Italy, as a joint event with 21st International Symposium on Fluorine Chemistry and was chaired by Pierangelo Metrangolo, Giuseppe Resnati and Giancarlo Terraneo.
 The seventh ISoFT meeting was held from August 9-11, 2017 at Tufts University outside Boston, MA, USA and was chaired by Krishna Kumar, Wei Zhang and Vittorio Montari.

Fluorous Technology Award 
In recognition of major contributions to fluorous chemistry:
 
 2005, István T. Horváth (City University of Hong Kong)
József Rábai (Eötvös Loránd University)
 2007, John A. Gladysz (Texas A&M University)
Dennis P. Curran (University of Pittsburgh)
 2009, Ilhyong Ryu (Osaka Prefecture University)
 2011, Gianluca Pozzi (CNR-Istituto di Scienze e Tecnologie Molecolari)
 2013, Richard H. Fish (Lawrence Berkeley National Laboratory)
Jean-Marc Vincent (University of Bordeaux)
 2015, Wei Zhang (University of Massachusetts)
 2017, Nicola Pohl (Indiana University)

References

Fluorine